The Seattle Metropolitans were a professional ice hockey team based in Seattle, Washington, playing in the Pacific Coast Hockey Association (PCHA) from 1915 to 1924. During their nine seasons, the Metropolitans were the PCHA's most successful franchise, as they went 112–96–2 in their nine years as a franchise (outpacing the next best team in the Vancouver Millionaires, who went 109–97–2 during that same period). The Metropolitans also won the most regular season PCHA championships, winning five times (while Vancouver won four), with Seattle finishing second on three other occasions. The Metropolitans played their home games at the 2,500 seat Seattle Ice Arena located downtown at 5th and University.

The Metropolitans made seven postseason appearances in their nine seasons. The team won the  Stanley Cup in 1917, tied for the Cup in 1919 and lost in five games in 1920. The story of the Metropolitans' 1917 championship, which made Seattle the first American team to win the Cup, was chronicled in the 2019 book When It Mattered Most. Seattle's Stanley Cup championship occurred 11 years before the New York Rangers became the National Hockey League's first American franchise to win the Cup in 1928.

The Metropolitans folded in 1924 when a replacement for the Seattle Ice Arena could not be found. Seattle's next team eligible to win the Stanley Cup, the NHL expansion Seattle Kraken, began play in 2021.

History

The Metropolitans were formed in 1915 as an expansion team by Frank and Lester Patrick, the owners of the Pacific Coast Hockey Association. The team's name was derived from the Metropolitan Building Company, the entity that built the Seattle Ice Arena on the University of Washington's Metropolitan Tract property.

A long simmering player war between the NHA and PCHA exploded once again in 1915 when the Patricks caught the Ottawa Senators trying to poach Vancouver's best player, Cyclone Taylor. In response, the Patricks raided the Toronto Blueshirts, signing Eddie Carpenter, Frank Foyston, Hap Holmes, Jack Walker and Cully Wilson for the Metropolitans. The Blueshirts had won the Stanley Cup in 1914 and this immediately provided Seattle with a competitive squad. To complete the roster, Pete Muldoon signed forward Bobby Rowe and offered a tryout to center Bernie Morris who had both been reserves the previous season in Victoria and cut by the team that summer. Muldoon immediately moved Rowe to defense, where he thrived, and Morris quickly made the team, scoring the game-winning goal in the Metropolitans' first game and eventually becoming a 5-time PCHA All-Star. Roy Rickey was signed a few weeks into the inaugural season after he was released by Vancouver. The Metropolitans signed Jim Riley just prior to the 1916-17 season after he, too, was cut by Victoria.

In an era of one-year contracts and rampant player movement, the Metropolitans roster remained relatively stable. With a typical roster of nine skaters, the Metropolitans had seven players spend seven or more seasons in Seattle. Foyston, Walker and Rowe played all nine campaigns while Morris, Holmes and Rickey spent eight years with the Metropolitans and Jim Riley seven, missing 1918 while serving overseas in World War I.

The team's official scorer was Royal Brougham, who covered the Metropolitans, Sonics, Seahawks and Mariners during his 68-year career at the Seattle Post-Intelligencer.

First U.S. Stanley Cup

Seattle won the 1917 championship by defeating the National Hockey Association's Montreal Canadiens three games to one by a combined score of 23–11. The heavily favored Canadiens trounced the Metropolitans in Game 1, despite arriving in Seattle the same morning. The Metropolitans would storm back to win Games 2, 3, and 4, outscoring Montreal 19-3. Fourteen of Seattle's goals were scored by Bernie Morris (including six in Game 4 alone). Games 1 and 3 were played under PCHA rules, including seven players per side, forward passing in the neutral zone, and no substitution for penalized players. Games 2 and 4 were played under NHA rules, including six players per side, no forward passing, and substitutions allowed.

Later years
After winning the 1917 Stanley Cup, the Metropolitans also played in the Stanley Cup Finals in 1919 (which was cancelled due to the Spanish flu pandemic after five games, with the series tied 2-2-1) and 1920, when they lost to the Ottawa Senators.

The day the 1919 playoffs began, star center Bernie Morris was arrested and jailed at Fort Lewis for draft evasion, despite being a Canadian citizen. Without their best scorer, the Metropolitans still defeated the Vancouver Millionaires in the PCHA championship series and jumped out to a 2-1 lead through Game three of the Stanley Cup Finals, outscoring Montreal 16-6 as Seattle's best player, Frank Foyston, scored eight goals. Game 4 of the 1919 Stanley Cup Finals resulted in a scoreless tie after two overtime periods. The Metropolitans' Cully Wilson netted the lone puck on the night only to have it waved off by referee Mickey Ion, who ruled that time had expired before the goal scored. The Metropolitans jumped out to a 4-1 lead in the third period of Game 5 before exhaustion consumed the short-handed Metropolitans. Montreal scored three goals in the final period to tie the game and force a second consecutive overtime match. With Frank Foyston injured in the period and Jack Walker out with a broken skate, Cully Wilson collapsed on the ice as the Canadiens scored the game winner to send the series to an unprecedented sixth game. The next morning, the Spanish flu pandemic struck the two teams, ultimately killing Montreal's Joe Hall and hospitalizing four other Canadiens. Unable to field a team, Montreal offered to forfeit the Cup. The offer was declined by Frank Patrick and Pete Muldoon, who felt championships should be won on the ice.

During the 1920 Stanley Cup finals, the Ottawa Senators wore solid white uniforms to avoid confusion with Seattle's barber pole style of green, red and white. Games 4 and 5 of the series were relocated from Ottawa to Toronto's Mutual Street Arena due to poor ice conditions.

The PCHA consisted of four teams for the 1915–16 and 1916-17 seasons, while operating under only three teams from 1917-18 until its final season in 1923-1924. From 1922-23, games against the Western Canada Hockey League (WCHL) counted in the PCHA standings. This allowed Seattle to have a losing record yet still win the league regular season championship in 1924. After the season, the owners of the newly built Olympic Hotel told the University that they needed the Seattle Ice Arena as a parking garage. The UW bought out the final year on the team's lease, sending the franchise's leadership scrambling to secure funding to build a new arena. When it became apparent they would not succeed, the Metropolitans folded with the core of the team joining Victoria. Vancouver and Victoria joined the WCHL for the 1924-1925 season with the Portland franchise playing the final western season of 1925-26.

Tributes 
Seattle's later hockey teams have paid tribute to the Metropolitans. The NHL owns the rights to the Metropolitans' trademarks in Canada. Paul Kim, an entrepreneur in Lynnwood, Washington, acquired the trademarks in the U.S. in 2016, after the prior owner abandoned them. Kim had intended to license the trademarks to a future NHL franchise in Seattle.

On December 5, 2015, the Seattle Thunderbirds held a special "Seattle Metropolitans Night" to celebrate 100 years of Seattle hockey. During the game, the team wore replicas of the original Metropolitans jersey and temporarily changed the team name to the Seattle Metropolitans. The final score was a 3–2 Metropolitans win over the Tri-City Americans.

The Seattle Jr. Totems of the Western States Hockey League named November 15–17, 2019 as "Seattle Hockey History Weekend" and wore the Metropolitans' colors during games.

The "S" logo of the National Hockey League's Seattle Kraken was designed as an homage to the Metropolitans' uniforms. On October 26, 2021, the Kraken raised a 1917 Stanley Cup Championship banner at Climate Pledge Arena before the team's game against the Canadiens. It was Montreal's first non-exhibition game in Seattle since the 1919 Stanley Cup Finals, which were not completed due to the Spanish flu pandemic.

Season-by-season record

Note: GP = Games played, W = Wins, L = Losses, T = Ties, Pts = Points, GF = Goals for, GA = Goals against

Statistical leaders

Hall of Famers
Five honored members of the Hockey Hall of Fame are recognized as part of the Seattle Metropolitans.

Frank C. Foyston
Harry (Hap) Holmes
Lester Patrick
John Phillip (Jack) Walker
Gordon (Doc) Roberts

References

External links

 Seattle Metropolitans (1915-1924) - HistoryLink.org
 Page with Seattle Metropolitans history
 Seattle Metropolitans win the Stanley Cup on March 26, 1917
 Seattle Metropolitans tie the Montreal Canadiens in a plague-stricken Stanley Cup Final on March 29, 1919
 Muldoon, Pete (1887-1929)
 Morris, Bernie (1890-1963)
 Foyston, Frank (1891-1966)

 
Ice hockey clubs established in 1915
Ice hockey clubs disestablished in 1924
Defunct ice hockey teams in the United States
Pacific Coast Hockey Association teams
Ice hockey teams in Washington (state)
1915 establishments in Washington (state)
1924 disestablishments in Washington (state)